The Sanjak of Rodos or Rhodes (Ottoman Turkish: Sancak-i/Liva-i Rodos) was a second-level Ottoman province (sanjak or liva) encompassing the Dodecanese or Southern Sporades islands, with Rhodes as its centre.

History 
After the Ottoman conquest of Rhodes  from the Knights Hospitaller in 1522, the island initially became the seat of a beylerbey, and was not subordinated to the Eyalet of the Archipelago as a sub-province (sanjak) until 1546. However, for most of the duration of Ottoman rule, apart from Rhodes itself, the other Southern Sporades islands (the remainder of the Dodecanese including Samos) were practically autonomous, and were not subject to a centralized administration until the introduction of the uniform vilayet-based administrative system in the 1860s. Rhodes itself did not enjoy this autonomy, and declined during the early Ottoman period both as a commercial centre and as a site of military importance, since the Eastern Mediterranean became an Ottoman lake. Only from the 18th century on is there evidence for an economic upturn in the island. 

During the Greek War of Independence, Rhodes and Kos did not take part in the uprising, although many Rhodians were members of the Filiki Etaireia and fled to join the Greek rebels. The other islands of the sanjak however rose up, most prominently Kasos until its destruction in 1824.

Rhodes apparently became the seat of the Kapudan Pasha (the chief admiral of the Ottoman Navy, who also served as governor of the Archipelago Eyalet) in the late 17th century. In 1849, Rhodes became officially the pasha-sanjak of the Archipelago province, now separated from any relation with the Kapudan Pasha. With the introduction of the vilayet system, the capital of the new Vilayet of the Archipelago was transferred to Kale-i Sultaniye in 1867, returned to Rhodes in 1877, went to Chios in 1880, before finally returning to Rhodes in 1888.

In 1912, the year the province was occupied by the Kingdom of Italy during the Italo-Turkish War, it comprised the kazas (districts) of Rodos itself, Kasot (Kasos), Mis (Kastellorizo), Sömbeki (Symi), Kerpe (Karpathos), and Istanköy (Kos). The islands were slated to be returned to the Ottoman Empire after the Treaty of Ouchy, but Italy took advantage of the outbreak of the Balkan Wars to continue its occupation. The islands were finally ceded to Greece in 1948, in the aftermath of World War II.

References 

History of the Dodecanese
Sanjaks of the Ottoman Empire in Europe
Ottoman Greece
States and territories established in 1522
States and territories disestablished in 1912
Sanjak of Rhodes
1522 establishments in the Ottoman Empire
1912 disestablishments in the Ottoman Empire